The Berlin Business Location Center (BLC) is an Internet business portal and consultation center serving companies that wish to invest or set up a business in Berlin.  The BLC is an information service provided by Berlin's economic development agency. Since 2001, the BLC has been advising investors on how to locate their business in Berlin, while also assisting Berlin-based companies with their foreign-trade activities.

The BLC is headquartered at Ludwig Erhard Haus in Berlin City West.  Another consultation office is located at Berlin Brandenburg Airport (BER).

Structure 
The BLC is run by Berlin Partner GmbH, which was created in 2003 when its two predecessor organizations, Wirtschaftsförderung Berlin International GmbH (WFBI) and the marketing company Partner für Berlin (established in 1994), merged.

The BLC is a public-private partnership entered into by private companies and the Federal Land of Berlin, via its business promotion agency Berlin Partner GmbH.  As of 2012, the project is supported by about 30 private and public institutions.  Investitonsbank Berlin (IBB) is the largest shareholder of BP and a partner of the BLC.

The BLC is financed mainly through partnership contributions and donations.

History 
The BLC was established in 2001 by then-Mayor Eberhard Diepgen and the Senator for Economics, Business and Technology Wolfgang Branoner.

This had been preceded by a 1998 resolution of the Berlin Senate to overhaul the whole range of the city's economic development activities.  The objective was to convert the previously heterogeneous organization of Berlin's business promotion into a centralized agency.

In this way, the BLC played a pioneering role in Europe as the first agency providing information to potential investors, not least because Berlin is the only city in Germany that has been mapped in a fully textured 3D format. The virtual presentation of Berlin as a site of business and industry in the 3D city model of Berlin, combined with industry-specific data about Berlin's economy gives potential investors all the information they need and a precise understanding of the location and surroundings of their future address in Berlin.

Awards 

 2013: Place Marketing Award 2013, Price for the BLC in the category „Place Marketing and Branding“ 
 2011: “Germany - Land of Ideas”, 365 locations in Germany: Prize for the BLC multi-media approach to marketing Berlin.
 2002: eCity Award for the best web-based business portal from among 130 such internet services in Europe.
 2001: A test conducted by Kienbaum Management Consultants GmbH evaluated the internet presences run by the economic development agencies in Germany's 50 biggest municipalities.  Berlin, with its BLC project, won first place.

External links 
 Official Web site

References 

Economy of Berlin
Organisations based in Berlin
2001 establishments in Germany